Chiedza Dhururu (born 4 January 1996) is a Zimbabwean cricketer who plays for the Zimbabwe women's national cricket team.

In January 2019, Dhururu was named in Zimbabwe's Women's Twenty20 International (WT20I) squad for their five-match series against Namibia. The matches were the first WT20I matches to be played by Zimbabwe since the International Cricket Council (ICC) awarded WT20I status to all of its members in July 2018. Dhururu did not play in the series against Namibia, but she was selected for the 2019 ICC Women's Qualifier Africa tournament in May 2019. She made her WT20I debut on 5 May 2019, for Zimbabwe against Mozambique. In October 2021, Dhururu was named in Zimbabwe's Women's One Day International (WODI) squad for their four-match series against Ireland. The fixtures were also the first WODI matches after Zimbabwe gained WODI status from the ICC in April 2021. She made her WODI debut on 5 October 2021, for Zimbabwe against Ireland.

In November 2021, she was named in Zimbabwe's team for the 2021 Women's Cricket World Cup Qualifier tournament in Zimbabwe.

References

External links

1996 births
Living people
Zimbabwean women cricketers
Zimbabwe women One Day International cricketers
Zimbabwe women Twenty20 International cricketers
Place of birth missing (living people)
Tuskers women cricketers